Myctophum lunatum is a species of lanternfish.

References

External links

Myctophidae
Taxa named by Vladimir Eduardovich Becker
Taxa named by Oksana Dmitrievna Borodulina
Fish described in 1978